Elections to the Jammu and Kashmir Legislative Assembly were held in January 1972 to elect members of 114 constituencies in Jammu and Kashmir, India. The Indian National Congress won the popular vote and a majority of seats and Syed Mir Qasim was appointed as the Chief Minister of Jammu and Kashmir. After this election, women entered the Jammu and Kashmir assembly for the first time. Ten women had filed their nominations, six of them contested and four won their seats. This made the percentage of women legislators 5.33% in the Jammu Kashmir assembly.

Result

Elected members

See also
List of constituencies of the Jammu and Kashmir Legislative Assembly
1972 elections in India

References

Jammu and Kashmir
1972
1972